was the 5th daimyō of Odawara Domain in Sagami Province (modern-day Kanagawa Prefecture) in mid-Edo period Japan. His courtesy title was Kaga no Kami.

Biography
Ōkubo Tadayoshi was the eldest son of Ōkubo Tadaoki, the 4th daimyō of Odawara, and was born at Odawara Castle. He became Ōkubo clan leader and daimyō of Odawara on the retirement of his father on September 10, 1763.  The implementation of further austerity measures in May 1764 in addition to those levied by his father indicates the continuing deterioration of the domain's financial situation. Tadayoshi had a weak constitution from childhood, and died only 6 years after becoming daimyō on October 1, 1769, at the age of 34. His grave is at the clan temple of Saishō-ji in Setagaya, Tokyo.

Takayoshi was married to a daughter of Sakakibara Masamine, daimyō of Himeji Domain in Harima Province.

References 
 Papinot, Edmond. (1906) Dictionnaire d'histoire et de géographie du japon. Tokyo: Librarie Sansaisha...Click link for digitized 1906 Nobiliaire du japon (2003)
 The content of much of this article was derived from that of the corresponding article on Japanese Wikipedia.

Fudai daimyo
Tadayoshi
1736 births
1769 deaths